The Secretary of Health and Human Resources is a member of the Virginia Governor's Cabinet.  The office is currently vacant pending confirmation of John Littel, Governor Glenn Youngkin's nominee for the post.

List of Secretaries of Health and Human Resources

Secretary of Human Affairs (July 1, 1972–1976)
 Otis L. Brown (1972–1976)

Secretary of Human Resources (1976–1988)
 Otis L. Brown (1976–1977)
 Jean L. Harris (1978–1982)
 Joseph L. Fisher (1982–1986)
 Eva S. Hardy (1986–1988)

Secretary of Health and Human Resources (1988–present)
 Eva S. Hardy (1988–1990)
 Howard Cullum (1990–1993)
 Kay Coles James (1994–1996)
 Robert C. Metcalf (1996–1998)
 Claude Allen (1998–2001)
 Louis Rossiter (2001–2002)
 Jane Woods (2002–2006)
 Marilyn Tavenner (2006–2010)
 Bill Hazel (2010–2018)
 Daniel Carey (2018–2022)
 John Littel (2022-; nominee)

References

1972 establishments in Virginia
Government agencies established in 1972
Health and Human Resources
Health and Human Resources